__notoc__

The Gates Computer Science Building, or Gates building for short, is an L-shaped building that houses the Computer Science Department as well as the Computer Systems Laboratory at 353 Jane Stanford Way, Stanford University, California. Construction on the building began in 1994 and was completed in 1996 at a cost of $36 million. It was named after Microsoft founder Bill Gates, who donated $6 million for the building's construction.

The building is organized into an A wing (the western ell) and a B wing (the northern ell). It is secured by an Intellikey system. Blueprints of the building are available online. The building was designed by Robert A.M. Stern Architects of New York City.

See also 
 Knowledge Systems Laboratory

References

Bibliography

External links 
Map: 

Buildings and structures completed in 1996
Stanford University buildings and structures
Robert A. M. Stern buildings
Bill Gates